Hapur is a city in, as well as the headquarters of, Hapur district, in Uttar Pradesh, India. National Highway 9 passes through the city, connecting it to Delhi.

History
Hapur is said to have been founded in the tenth century.

Hapur is listed in the Ain-i-Akbari as a pargana under Delhi sarkar, producing a revenue of 2,103,589 dams for the imperial treasury and supplying a force of 300 infantry and 4 cavalry.

It was granted by Daulat Scindia to his French general Pierre Cuillier-Perron at the end of the 18th century. Under the British Raj, Hapur was within Meerut District, was surrounded by several fine groves, and carried on considerable trade in sugar, jaggery (gur), grain, cotton, timber, bamboo, and brass and steel utensils. The important cavalry remount depot and farm of Babugarh adjoined the town. Earlier it was within Ghaziabad district but in 2012 it became a separate district. It comes within Meerut commissionaire.

Geography
It has an average elevation of 213 meters (699 feet) (higher than its neighbors).

Climate

Hapur has a monsoon-influenced humid subtropical climate characterised by very hot summers and cool winters. Summers last from early April to late June and are extremely hot, with temperatures reaching . The monsoon arrives in late June and continues until the middle of September. Temperatures drop slightly, with plenty of cloud cover, but with higher humidity. Temperatures rise again in October; and the city then has a mild, dry winter season from late October to the middle of March.

Rainfall is about 90 cm to 100 cm per annum, which is suitable for growing crops. Most of the rainfall is received during the monsoon. Humidity varies from 30 to 100%.

Demographics

According to the 2011 census, Hapur had a population of 317,004, consisting of 167,933 males and 149,071 females. The literacy rate was 63.40%.

Hinduism is the majority religion in Hapur city, with 174,278 (66.27%) followers. Islam is the second-most popular religion in Hapur, with 84,477 (32.12%). Followers of Sikhism number 2,163 (0.82%), Jainism 981 (0.37%), Christianity 765 (0.29%), and Buddhism 162 (0.06%). Approximately 156 (0.06%) stated "No Particular Religion" and 1 (0.00%) stated "Other Religion".

Hapur-Pilkhuwa Development Authority
Many high-standard educational and research institutes are being established in the Hapur-Pilkhuwa Development Region, e.g. a dental college and research institute, engineering colleges, commerce colleges a Delhi Public School branch, and other educational and research centres. Similarly, in housing development, many famous developers like Ansal Housing Group, Eros Group, etc., are investing large amounts of money in constructing housing for the town.

People from Hapur
Abdul Haq, the pioneer of Anjuman Taraqqi-i-Urdu and the leader of the Urdu movement in British India. 
Chaudhary Charan Singh, the former prime minister of India, was born in the village of Noorpur, Hapur.
Gajraj Singh, Indian National Congress, is from Hapur. In the past, he has represented Hapur in the Uttar Pradesh Legislative Assembly.
Ram Charan, a renowned management thinker and guru, is originally from Hapur
Dayanand Prajapati, religious singer, Director, poet, musician

See also
 Asouda
 Dhaulana
 Bhudia

References

External links
 

Cities and towns in Hapur district
Cities in Uttar Pradesh
Hapur